Game & Wario is a party video game in the WarioWare series developed by Nintendo for the Wii U, named after the series of electronic games known as Game & Watch. The eighth installment in the WarioWare series, it revolves around 16 minigames played using the Wii U GamePad. The game was released in Japan on March 28, 2013, North America on June 23, 2013, Europe on June 28, 2013, and Australia on June 29, 2013. Game & Wario is the only WarioWare game to be released on the Wii U.

Gameplay
The game offers sixteen mini-games, consisting of twelve single-player titles (two of which can be played with two players) and four multiplayer-only titles for up to five players. The game exclusively uses the Wii U GamePad with no need for additional Wii U Pro Controllers. During the game, players can earn tokens which can be used in a 'Cluck-a-Pop' capsule machine to unlock additional toys and minigames.

Single player titles
Arrow
Arrow is a single player game in which players control Wario in which he must defend a crop of strawberries from oncoming robots. The GamePad is used as a bow used to launch arrows at opponents. Hitting explosive objects allows players to take out multiple enemies at once. Players can also use limited pepper shakers to fire an explosive shot. If the robots reach the front of the screen, they will launch an attack on the GamePad screen, requiring the player to tap them to stop them stealing their strawberries.
Shutter
Shutter (Camera in PAL regions) is a photography game hosted by Mona that tasks players with using the GamePad as a camera to take photos of specific individuals amongst a crowd of characters. The TV displays the entire event and the player holds the GamePad upright parallel to the TV to see a zoomed-in portion of the event on the GamePad screen and capture photos of the correct characters. Players earn more points based on how quick they capture photos of all of the desired characters and the quality of the photos.
Ski
Ski is a single player game in which players control Jimmy T. as he skis down a slope. The game is played with the GamePad held vertically, tilting the controller to steer Jimmy. The television screen shows an action camera of Jimmy's progress. The game has five levels that are single slopes, with the goal of reaching the bottom as quickly as possible, and an endless mode, in which the player has to ski for as long as possible without falling off the slope.
Patchwork
 Patchwork is a game hosted by Kat and Ana in which players use the GamePad's touchscreen to place patchwork puzzle pieces in the correct spots to solve each puzzle.
Kung Fu
Kung Fu is a platform game hosted by Young Cricket & Master Mantis. Players must tilt the GamePad in order to guide Young Cricket over a series of platforms, collecting dumplings to satisfy his hunger. Players can see upcoming platforms and obstacles on the TV screen and guide where Young Cricket lands from looking at the GamePad screen.
Gamer
Gamer is a single player game in which players control 9-Volt as he decides to play video games in bed. On the GamePad, players are tasked with WarioWare style microgames, featuring simple objectives that must be completed quickly. However, the player must also pay attention to the television screen and be prepared to hide the video game to avoid being caught by 9-Volt's mother 5-Volt. To prevent the player from hiding his video game too often, 9-Volt also has a meter that decreases his awakeness as he hides. The game ends if 9-Volt is caught by 5-Volt, runs out of lives in his game, or ends up falling asleep by hiding for too long. Players can also play the WarioWare minigames on their own by choosing 18-Volt. A stage based on this game is featured in Super Smash Bros. for Wii U. This mini game is also a feature in WarioWare Gold for the Nintendo 3DS.
Design
Design is a game hosted by Dr. Crygor for 1 or 2 players. Using the stylus, players must draw specific shapes on the GamePad screen according to Crygor's instructions, such as drawing lines of a certain length, circles of a specific diameter, etc. At the end of the game, the sketches are realized to be components of a robot and attach to the face of a newly-constructed robot depending on how close the sketches came to the instructions. Higher scores correspond to better built robots, while lower scores correspond to broken down robots.
Ashley
Ashley is a game hosted by Ashley, in which players tilt the GamePad and use the shoulder buttons to guide Ashley on her broom through a dessert world. Ashley travels to the right and players tilt the GamePad to change her position up and down on the screen to obtain as many collectibles as possible in each level.
Taxi
Taxi is a game hosted by Dribble & Spitz. Using the GamePad, the player must ferry around passengers whilst fighting off UFOs that are trying to snatch them.
Pirates
 Pirates is a rhythm game hosted by Captain Wario. Players must follow commands issued by Wario and move the GamePad around like a shield in order to block flying arrows, flicking the GamePad down at the end of each line to shake them off. 
Bowling
Bowling is a game of bowling for 1–2 players, in which players use the GamePad to bowl at pins in the shape of the characters seen throughout the game. The players hold the GamePad vertically, swipe the screen in the direction they intend to bowl, and tilt the GamePad to change the ball's movement.
Bird
A remake of the Pyoro mini-game from WarioWare, Inc.: Mega Microgames!, presented in a Game & Watch style presentation on the GamePad and a unique visual style on the TV. Players use Pyoro's elongated tongue to grab fruit falling from the air, trying to keep them from touching the ground, which destroys its footing, or landing on Pyoro's head, which results in a game over.

Multiplayer titles
Disco
Disco is a rhythm game for 2 players, hosted by Mike. Players take it in turns to come up with rhythmic button presses that the other player must bounce back in time to the music.
Fruit
Fruit is a game for 2–5 players hosted by Penny. One player controls the GamePad and selects a character from several character options to be the thief. Their goal is to discreetly steal multiple fruit amongst a crowd of characters whilst not making their character noticed to the other players viewing the television screen. At various intervals, hints will appear on the TV showing the rough location of the thief. At the end of the game, the guessing players take turns to select who they believed to be the thief.
Islands
Islands is a game for 2–5 players featuring Fronk. Players take turns using the GamePad to launch their Fronks onto a target board featuring various scoring zones. Players may also try to knock other players' Fronks around in the process.
Sketch
Sketch (Artwork in PAL region) is a game for 2–5 players hosted by Orbulon. Similar to games like Pictionary, players take turn holding the GamePad and must draw pictures based on certain clues whilst the other players guess what the clue is. Points are awarded for the number of correctly guessed pictures drawn within the time limit.

Development
The game was initially conceived as a technical demonstration of the Wii U GamePad's features, to be pre-installed on every Wii U system. However, in the summer of 2012 it was decided that the game would be released as full software after the development team felt they had created too many ideas to be pre-installed. After much experimentation, the team decided to release the game with a Wario theme.
Some of the games were also used as Wii U technical demonstrations at E3 2011.
In May 2013, Nintendo of America launched Crowdfarter, a parody of Kickstarter, to encourage fans to promote the game via social media.

Reception

Game & Wario received mixed reviews with a current score of 61 in Metacritic. Famitsu gave the game a score of 31/40. IGN gave the game a score of 5.1, criticizing a sparse game selection with only a few excellent ones. GameTrailers gave the game a score of 6.5, stating the clever ideas are overshadowed by uninspired mini-games. GameSpot gave the game a score of 5.0, calling it "too uneven and frustrating to wholly recommend." Destructoid gave the game a score of 7.5, stating that despite some unoriginality, all of the games are polished and fun. Game Informer gave the game an 8.0, noting how it "showcases the Wii U’s unique features well" while calling the number of multiplayer games "disappointingly small". Eurogamer scored the game a 6 out 10, stating that "There's fun to be had, but this isn't the reliable source of brilliant design that it should be. If you expected breezy old Wario to make sense of the Wii U in some fundamental manner, you're going to be disappointed by a game that occasionally seems quietly defeated by its host platform. You'll hope for an epiphany, but in Game & Wario's least inspired moments, what you'll get can feel uncomfortably close to an inquest."

The game sold 81,837 physical units in Japan. In the United States, it sold 36,000 units . Combined, the game sold 117,837 units in Japan and the United States.

Notes

References

External links
Official US site
Official minisite
Official Australian catalogue site
Crowdfarter.com

2013 video games
Nintendo Network games
Party video games
Video games developed in Japan
Wii U games
Wii U eShop games
Wii U-only games
WarioWare
Multiplayer and single-player video games
Intelligent Systems games
Video games using Havok